The 2006–07 North Carolina Tar Heels men's basketball team represented the University of North Carolina at Chapel Hill during the 2006–07 NCAA Division I men's basketball season. Their head coach was Roy Williams. The team played its home games in the Dean Smith Center in Chapel Hill, North Carolina as a member of the Atlantic Coast Conference.

Recruiting

Roster

Schedule and Results

|-
!colspan=9 style="background:#56A0D3; color:#FFFFFF;"| Exhibition
|-

|-
!colspan=9 style="background:#56A0D3; color:#FFFFFF;"| Regular Season
|-

|-
!colspan=9 style="background:#56A0D3; color:#FFFFFF;"| ACC tournament
|-

|-
!colspan=9 style="background:#56A0D3; color:#FFFFFF;"| NCAA tournament
|-

|- style="background:#f9f9f9;"
| colspan=9 | *Non-Conference Game. #Rankings from AP Poll.  All times are in Eastern Time.
|}

Team players drafted into the NBA

References 

North Carolina
North Carolina Tar Heels men's basketball seasons
North Carolina
North Carolina Tar Heels men's basketball
North Carolina Tar Heels men's basketball